Sporting Athletic Club, known as AC Sporting or simply Sporting, is a football club based in Beirut, Lebanon, that competes in the . They first competed in the Lebanese Premier League in 2021, having won the 2020–21 Lebanese Second Division.

History

Al Jihad SC 
On 23 October 1963, Al Jihad SC, based in Hay El Sellom, a district in Beirut, was formally recognized as a non-profit sports and cultural organization. They played their first official season in 1997, in the Lebanese Fifth Division, which they won in 1999–2000. In 2007–08 they won the Lebanese Third Division, and were promoted to the Lebanese Second Division.

Al Khoyol FC 
On 2 September 2009, the club relocated to Ghobeiry, and changed their name to Al Khoyol FC.

In 2009–10, Khoyol lost a decisive match for promotion to the Lebanese Premier League against Akhaa Ahli Aley. The following season, in 2010–11, Khoyol lost to Ahli Saida in another decisive promotion match. In both instances, Khoyol complained to the Lebanese Football Association (LFA) for supposed match fixing.

In 2014, Khoyol were relegated to the Third Division.

AC Sporting 
On 24 April 2018, the club changed their name to AC Sporting and moved to Beirut: they promptly gained promotion to the Lebanese Second Division in 2019, coming first in the Lebanese Third Division. Sporting won the 2020–21 Lebanese Second Division, and gained promotion to the Lebanese Premier League for the first time in their history. After finishing in last place, Sporting were relegated back to the Second Division.

Players

Current squad

Honours 
 Lebanese Second Division
 Winners (1): 2020–21

 Lebanese Third Division
 Winners (1): 2018–19

 Lebanese Fifth Division
 Winners (1): 1999–2000

See also 
 List of football clubs in Lebanon

Notes

References

AC Sporting
Football clubs in Lebanon
1963 establishments in Lebanon
Association football clubs established in 1997
Association football clubs established in 2009
Association football clubs established in 2018